Václav Machek may refer to:

 Václav Machek (cyclist) (1925–2017), Czech Olympic cyclist
 Václav Machek (linguist) (1894–1965), Czech linguist